Major General Prasad Edirisinghe psc, is the Rector, Southern Campus, General Sir John Kotelawala Defence University.

Early life
Edirisinghe received his education from Nalanda College, Colombo. He is a graduate of Defence Studies from General Sir John Kotelawala Defence University and also has obtained his master's degree in Public Administration from University of Colombo.

References

 A country could raise the resilience by promoting civil-military relations through education - Defence Secretary
 Resilience could be achieved through education - Defence Secretary
 INTER BATTALION NOVICES TAEKWONDO TOURNAMENT 2022 WON BY 4TH BATTALION THE GEMUNU WATCH

Sri Lankan Buddhists
Sri Lankan major generals
Sinhalese military personnel
Alumni of Nalanda College, Colombo
Sri Lanka Military Academy graduates
Living people
Year of birth missing (living people)